Lonesome is a 1928 American comedy drama part-talkie film directed by Paul Fejös, and starring Barbara Kent and Glenn Tryon. Its plot follows two working-class residents of New York City over a 24-hour-period, during which they have a chance meeting at Coney Island during the Independence Day weekend and swiftly fall in love with one another. It was produced and distributed by Universal Pictures.

In 2010, it was selected for preservation in the United States National Film Registry by the Library of Congress as being "culturally, historically, or aesthetically significant". The film was released on Blu-ray disc and DVD on August 28, 2012, as part of the Criterion Collection.

It was remade in 1935 as a comedy called The Affair of Susan.

Plot
In New York City, Mary is a telephone operator who lives alone and is lonely. Jim is a factory worker who also lives alone, and feels disconnected from the world. During the Independence Day weekend, both Mary and Jim decide to visit Coney Island alone after finishing their Saturday half-day work shifts. The two board the same bus, mutually catching the other's attention, and again encounter each other once they arrive at the beach.

After the two spend some time together on the beach, Mary realizes she has lost the wedding ring she wears. Jim helps her locate it, but is disheartened, believing she is married. Mary reassures him after they find the ring that it is only her mother's wedding band. As night falls, Mary laments the fact that their day together is over, but Jim assures her it is not, and they continue to spend time together at the amusement park, visiting a fortune teller and riding amusement park rides. The two ride the Cyclone rollercoaster, but after one of the cars crashes, a melee ensues among the parkgoers, during which Mary and Jim are separated.

Only knowing each other's first name, and having only a small photo of each other, Jim and Mary are desperate to find each other. Jim attempts to locate Mary in the park, but a rainstorm causes further complications, sending the hundreds of park visitors scattering. A defeated Jim leaves Coney Island by train, as does Mary. Mary retreats to her apartment, where she begins to cry and beat her hands against the walls in despair. The noise catches the attention of Jim, who can hear it through the other wall—unbeknownst to either of them, the two are neighbors in their apartment building, but had never crossed paths prior. Jim opens the door to Mary's apartment and sees her standing before her bed. Shocked, but elated, the two embrace.

Cast

Production
Lonesome was one of the first films to have sound and a few talking scenes. It was released in both silent and monaural versions. Some scenes in existing original prints of the film are colored with stencils.

Home media
In 2012, The Criterion Collection released Lonesome on DVD and Blu-ray, with Fejos' 1929 films Broadway and The Last Performance as extra features.

References

External links

Lonesome essay  by Raquel Stecher on the National Film Registry website

Still at The Hollywood Revue
Stills at silentsaregolden.com
Lonesome: Great City, Great Solitude an essay by Phillip Lopate at the Criterion Collection
Lonesome essay by Daniel Eagan In America's Film Legacy, 2009-2010: A Viewer's Guide To The 50 Landmark Movies Added To The National Film Registry In 2009-10, Bloomsbury Publishing Usa, 2011,  Pages 31–34 

1928 films
1920s romantic comedy-drama films
American black-and-white films
American romantic comedy-drama films
American silent feature films
Films directed by Paul Fejos
Films set in Coney Island
Films set in New York City
Transitional sound comedy-drama films
United States National Film Registry films
Universal Pictures films
1928 comedy films
1928 drama films
1920s American films
1920s English-language films
Silent romantic comedy-drama films
Silent American comedy-drama films